Sarita Phongsri (born October 12, 1991) is a Thai taekwondo practitioner. She's been nicknamed "Yin".

External links 
 

 Profile from The-Sports.org

Living people
Sarita Phongsri
1991 births
Asian Games medalists in taekwondo
Taekwondo practitioners at the 2010 Asian Games
Taekwondo practitioners at the 2014 Asian Games
Sarita Phongsri
Medalists at the 2010 Asian Games
Universiade medalists in taekwondo
Sarita Phongsri
Southeast Asian Games medalists in taekwondo
Competitors at the 2009 Southeast Asian Games
Universiade bronze medalists for Thailand
World Taekwondo Championships medalists
Medalists at the 2009 Summer Universiade
Sarita Phongsri